Moses Fasanya was a Nigerian colonel from Ibadan, Oyo State who served as Military Administrator of Abia State (August 1996 – August 1998) during the military regime of General Sani Abacha. 
He then became Military Administrator of Ondo State in August 1998, handing over power to the civilian governor Adebayo Adefarati in May 1999.

He caused difficulty in Ondo State by clumsy handling of the election of the traditional Owo leader, leading to chaos, killing and  destruction of property.
In October 1998, hundreds of people were killed in clashes between local Ijaws in the Akpata region and Ilaje Yorubas seeking work on a newly found oilfield. Fasanya had difficulty finding agreement with Ijaw leaders on ways to stabilize the situation.
He deployed soldiers and police to the area in an attempt to restore peace.
In February 1999, Fasanya's aides mistreated and detained fifteen journalists covering a meeting of state administrators of the Odu'a Investment Company in Akure.

In March 2009, an oil tanker caught fire in Obadore near Lagos State University. Ex-governor Fasanya lost printing materials and other goods worth over N3 million which he had stored in ten shops in the town that were destroyed in the blaze.

References

Nigerian Army officers
Living people
Governors of Abia State
Governors of Ondo State
Yoruba military personnel
People from Ibadan
Year of birth missing (living people)